Dr. Kofi George Konuah  (19 August 1904 – 6 June 1996) was a Ghanaian educationist, public servant and statesman who served as Chairman of the Public Services Commission of Ghana from 1962 to 1969.

Early life
Konuah was born on 19 August 1904 in Kumasi, Ashanti to parents of Ga-Adangbe ethnic origin. His father, Alexander Konuah, a Gold Coast civil servant, was an assistant treasurer in the colonial service. Alex Konuah belonged to the Bruce family of British Jamestown, and the Konuah family whose roots are in Elmina. His mother, Elizabeth Quao, also known as  Naa Densua II was the  Otublohum Manye (queenmother).

Konuah was educated at the Government Boys' Schools at Cape Coast and Accra from 1910 to 1919. He had his secondary education at the Wesleyan Boys' School in Freetown, Sierra Leonne. He was made the head boy in his final year and completed in 1925. He continued at Fourah Bay College and was a student at the college during Kwegyir Aggrey's visit when the college had its centenary celebration. Aggrey impressed upon Konuah the idea of taking up teaching as a career. He graduated from Fourah Bay College in 1928, with a B. A. degree from Durham University. In 1946, he was awarded a British Council Bursary to study for a Diploma in Education at the University of London.

Public life
Konuah first taught at Christ Church Grammar School and for a brief while at Achimota School in 1930. Not too soon long after this, Konuah together with three others decided to set up a private school to cater for the educational needs of children who showed some aptitude for learning but whose parents could not afford to send them to the existing schools of the day. They were James Akwei Halm-Addo, Konuah's mate at the Wesleyan Boys School and Gottfried Narku Alema and SamueI Neils Awuletey who were colleagues of his at Fourah Bay College. In July 1931, they founded the Accra Academy in a property given out by Madam Ellen Buckle. Konuah served as the first Principal of the Accra Academy. 
 
In 1948, he served as deputy to Nii Kwabena Bonne, then Osu Alata Mantse, on Nii Bonne's Anti-Inflation Campaign Committee, which was set up to demand a reduction in the prices of foreign goods in the country at the time. 
   
In 1950, he became a member of the Sir Leslie MacCarthy's Prisons Commission. In 1952, he served as a member of a Commission of Enquiry to study the health needs of the Gold Coast led by Sir. John Maude. He was the only African member of the four-man commission.  
 
He resigned his post as Principal of Accra Academy to become the second African member of the Public Services Commission in 1953. He was made chairman of the board of governors of Accra Academy from 1954 to 1967. In 1955, Konuah served on the International School Committee that saw to the establishment of Ghana International School which he later served as the school's board chair.  
 
On the demise of Sir C.W Tachie Menson (the first African member of the Public Services Commission), Konuah became Chairman of the Public Services Commission in 1962. Konuah also served as Chairman of the Governing Council of the Ghana Institute of Management and Public Administration from 1962 to 1969. He was also the first Chairman of the Ghana Mental Health Association. He served as the Chairman of the Society of friends of Lepers.
 
In 1964, he was a member of a three-member presidential commission set up by Kwame Nkrumah to discharge presidential functions in Nkrumah's indisposal to act as president.
 
After the 1966 overthrow of the Convention People's Party, he became a member of the political committee and the National Advisory Committee set-up by the National Liberation Council. He was Chairman of the Audit Service Board from 1970 and retired from public service in 1974.

Personal life and family
Konuah was a lifelong congregant of the Anglican Church.  He married Janet Buccholz and together, they had nine (9) children. Notable among them was, Dr. William Godson Bruce-Konuah, a medical doctor and politician who served as a Minister in the Busia government.

Honours
Konuah was awarded Officer of the Order of the British Empire in 1956 and the Companion of the Order of the British Empire in 1960. In 1963, the University of Ghana presented him an honorary doctorate. He was amongst the first three persons chosen to be given that honour by the university. The two others were W.E.B. Du Bois and Sir Arku Korsah. In 1968, the National Liberation Council awarded Konuah the Grand Medal (Civil Division) of the Republic of Ghana.

Death and legacy
He died on 6 June 1996 and is buried in the forecourt of the administration of Accra Academy. Konuah is remembered for his exploits in providing an education for children who showed some aptitude but whose parents who could not afford to send their children to the existing schools of the day in his country, Ghana. He is also remembered as one of the initiators of the first privately founded school in Gold Coast and not only so but for the first time in the then Gold Coast, a school had been founded without the help of any church group or denomination. The Konuah-Halm-Addo-Alema-Awuletey Lectures is held annually in joint honour of him.

References

Heads of schools in Ghana
Ghanaian educators
Fourah Bay College alumni
Ga-Adangbe people
People from Accra
Bruce family of Ghana
1904 births
1996 deaths